Jørgen Hansen (27 March 1943 – 15 March 2018) was a Danish welterweight boxer.

Hansen competed for Denmark at the 1968 Summer Olympics in the welterweight division but lost his first match. Hansen turned professional shortly after the games and was active as a professional until 1982.

Hansen fought for the WBC world light welterweight title in 1973, but was stopped by Italian Bruno Arcari.

Hansen won the European welterweight title in 1977 against Italian Marco Scano but lost the title by disqualification in his first defense. In 1978 he was awarded a chance to regain the title against Frenchman Alain Marion whom Hansen stopped in the 6th round of the title bout. Hansen later lost the title by disqualification. Hansen won the European title for the third time when he knocked out British European champion Dave Boy Green in the third round. He defended the title successfully six times before giving up the title at the end of 1981. His fought his last fight in December 1982 winning a decision against former world champion Perico Fernandez.

Hansen retired in 1982 with a professional record of 78-14-0 (34 KO's).

The 2017 Danish film, Den Bedste Mand, (Pound for Pound) is based on Hansen's and friend Ayub Kalule's lives.

References

External links
 
 

1943 births
2018 deaths
Welterweight boxers
Boxers at the 1968 Summer Olympics
Olympic boxers of Denmark
Sportspeople from Aarhus
Danish male boxers